Océane Sercien-Ugolin (born 15 December 1997) is a French handball player for Vipers Kristiansand and the French national team. She competed at the 2020 Summer Olympics, winning a gold medal in Women's team handball.

Career
In April 2017, she was called up to the France team for the first time, but was injured. She was finally recalled in May 2018 to participate in two friendly matches against Norway.

She played for Issy Paris Handball until 2020, she signed in June 2018. In 2020, she went to Slovenia to play for RK Krim.

She participated in the 2019 World Women's Handball Championship.

Achievements
Norwegian Cup:
Winner: 2022/23

References

External links

Living people
1997 births
French female handball players
People from Cherbourg-Octeville
Expatriate handball players
French expatriate sportspeople in Slovenia
Olympic gold medalists for France
Olympic medalists in handball
Medalists at the 2020 Summer Olympics
Handball players at the 2020 Summer Olympics
Olympic handball players of France
Sportspeople from Manche